The European act of state in honour of Helmut Kohl was an act of state to honour former German Chancellor Helmut Kohl following his death, and took place at the European Parliament in Strasbourg, France on 1 July 2017 from 11 AM to 1 PM. It was announced by the European Commission on 18 June 2017, and was the first European act of state in the history of the European Union. It was co-organised by the European Commission, the European Parliament and the European Council.

Helmut Kohl died on 16 June 2017 and was survived by his sons Walter Kohl and Peter Kohl, and grandchildren Johannes Volkmann and Leyla Kohl. The European Commission announced that it was planning a grand ceremony, attended by European heads of state and government, to honour Kohl. Kohl was one of only three people to be awarded the title Honorary Citizen of Europe by the European Union, and was, together with French President François Mitterrand, one of the two principal architects of the Maastricht Treaty which established the European Union and the euro currency. He was also considered the "father of the German reunification."

Controversy
No member of the Kohl family—Kohl's children and grandchildren—attended the ceremony, owing to a feud with Kohl's controversial second wife Maike Kohl-Richter, who had among other things barred them from paying their respects to their father and grandfather after his death, ignored their wish for a ceremony in Berlin and their wish that Kohl should be interred alongside his parents and his wife of four decades Hannelore Kohl in the family tomb. Richter had also attempted to bar Chancellor Merkel from speaking and wanted to have Viktor Orbán, who has fiercely criticized Merkel's refugee policy, speak instead.

Speakers

The speakers at the ceremony were, in the following order
Antonio Tajani, President of the European Parliament and former European Commissioner for Industry and Entrepreneurship
Jean-Claude Juncker, President of the European Commission and former Prime Minister of Luxembourg
 Donald Tusk, President of the European Council and former Prime Minister of Poland
 Felipe González, former Prime Minister of Spain
 Bill Clinton, former President of the United States and a contemporary friend  of Kohl
 Dmitry Medvedev, Prime Minister and former President of Russia
 Emmanuel Macron, President of France
 Angela Merkel, Chancellor of Germany

Other guests

Incumbent heads of state and government
Frank-Walter Steinmeier, President of Germany
Dalia Grybauskaitė, President of Lithuania
Petro Poroshenko, President of Ukraine
Andrzej Duda, President of Poland
Alexander Van der Bellen, President of Austria
Benjamin Netanyahu, Prime Minister of Israel
Viktor Orbán, Prime Minister of Hungary
Mark Rutte, Prime Minister of the Netherlands
Stefan Löfven, Prime Minister of Sweden
Charles Michel, Prime Minister of Belgium
Juha Sipilä, Prime Minister of Finland
Theresa May, Prime Minister of the United Kingdom

Former heads of state and government
Joachim Gauck, former President of Germany
Christian Wulff, former President of Germany
Horst Köhler, former President of Germany
Gerhard Schröder, former Chancellor of Germany
King Juan Carlos and Queen Sofia of Spain
Felipe González, former Prime Minister of Spain
Jose Maria Aznar, former Prime Minister of Spain
Paavo Lipponen, former Prime Minister of Finland
John Major, former Prime Minister of the United Kingdom
Nicolas Sarkozy, former President of France
Romano Prodi, former Prime Minister of Italy and President of the European Commission
Silvio Berlusconi, former Prime Minister of Italy
Mario Monti, former Prime Minister of Italy and European Commissioner for Competition
Guy Verhofstadt, former Prime Minister of Belgium
Jerzy Buzek, former Prime Minister of Poland and President of the European Parliament
Franz Vranitzky, former Chancellor of Austria
Herman Van Rompuy, former Prime Minister of Belgium and President of the European Council
Wolfgang Schüssel, former Chancellor of Austria
Jacques Santer, former Prime Minister of Luxembourg and President of the European Commission
Rudolf Schuster, former President of Slovakia
José Manuel Barroso, former Prime Minister of Portugal and President of the European Commission
Aníbal Cavaco Silva, former President of Portugal
Jean Chrétien, former Prime Minister of Canada
B. J. Habibie, former President of Indonesia

European Union leaders
Martin Schulz, former President of the European Parliament
Hans-Gert Pöttering, former President of the European Parliament
Josep Borrell, former President of the European Parliament
Pat Cox, former President of the European Parliament
Frans Timmermans, First Vice President of the European Commission
Federica Mogherini, High Representative of the Union for Foreign Affairs and Security Policy
Günther Oettinger, European Commissioner for Budget and Human Resources
Maroš Šefčovič, European Commissioner for Energy Union

References

2017 in France
2017 in international relations
2017 in politics
2017 in the European Union
21st century in Strasbourg
Helmut Kohl
July 2017 events in France